The Brit Award for International Male Solo Artist is an award given by the British Phonographic Industry (BPI), an organisation which represents record companies and artists in the United Kingdom. The accolade is presented at the Brit Awards, an annual celebration of British and international music. The winners and nominees are determined by the Brit Awards voting academy with over one-thousand members, which comprise record labels, publishers, managers, agents, media, and previous winners and nominees.

History
The award was first presented in 1989 as International Male Solo Artist. The accolade was not handed out at the 1990, 1992 and 1993 ceremonies, with the award for International Solo Artist (given to a male or female artist) being awarded instead. The award for International Male Solo Artist was reinstated in 1994, and has been given ever since.

International Male Solo Artist has been won by Beck, Kanye West and Eminem the most times, with three wins. Artists from the United States have almost exclusively won the award, aside from one Australian win (Michael Hutchence), one Jamaican win (Shaggy) and three Canadian wins (Justin Bieber, Drake and the Weeknd).

Winners and nominees

Multiple nominations and awards

Notes
 Michael Jackson (1984), Prince (1985) also won Brit Award for International Artist
 Michael Jackson (1988), Prince (1992–1993) also won Brit Award for International Solo Artist
 Justin Bieber (2011) also won Brit Award for International Breakthrough Act

References

Brit Awards
Awards established in 1989
Awards established in 1991
Awards established in 1994
Awards disestablished in 1989
Awards disestablished in 1991